Hrimhari is a fictional character appearing in American comic books published by Marvel Comics. He was first introduced in the New Mutants Special Edition #1 (December 1985), and was created by Chris Claremont and Art Adams.

Fictional character biography
A descendant of the Fenris Wolf, Hrimhari was the Wolf Prince in the realm of Asgard. He presided over all wolves in the enchanted woods of that land, but retained a humble and gentle demeanor not normally associated with that of royalty. He originally had the ability to change his form from that of a gray wolf to a shape resembling a wolf-human hybrid (like the form associated with werewolves in modern fiction or Cynocephali of lore). He is highly respected by the people of Asgard, and is said to be a true friend of Hogun the Grim. However, the giants of Asgard are mortal enemies of the wolf people and hunt them down at every opportunity.

Captured by Loki
When the New Mutants were magically taken to Asgard, Wolfsbane met Hrimhari in a wood while being chased by giants. Immediately enchanted by her, Hrimhari saves Rahne and the two became almost inseparable. Rahne has similar feelings but does not know how to deal with them, due to her strict upbringing. The god Loki manages to capture the two lovers and transformed them into more sinister versions of their man-wolf forms under his servitude. Under these guises they were known as Grimfang and Bleakheart. They are eventually changed back to their original selves but were forced to be separated once Rahne returned to Earth. Rahne had wanted to be with Hrimhari more, but to do so would force the other X-Men and New Mutants to stay behind also.

Fighting Hela
Years later, the death goddess Hela tried to take over Asgard. Part of her plan to conquer Asgard and kill a then-helpless Odin, using the Wolves of the forest as her scouts and spies. Hrimhari fought Hela's armies for his people's freedom but he was eventually captured and prisoned. Through the link Danielle Moonstar held with the Valkyries the New Mutants discovered Hela's plan and rescued Hrimhari. In the heat of battle and due to a mystical forcefield, Hrimhari was separated from the majority of the group, ending up with Meltdown and Warlock. After some delays, the trio headed straight for Odin's chambers, not understanding that he was under the much-needed Odinsleep (a process that would restore his energy and vitality). They were soon captured by a guard and tossed in prison. With their powers, they could escape, but those they need to talk to, Balder the Brave and the Warriors Three would be returning anyway from other lands.

The children of Volstagg, a member of the Warriors Three, appear at the cell's window, having eavesdropped on the current happenings. They know of Hrimhari, through the tales told by Hogun the Grim, their father's teammate. He, in turn, had heard of Volstagg's children through Hogun's tales himself. Understanding that the power of Thor, Balder and the others might not quite be enough, the children tell of the sorcerer Tiwaz, who lives in Astrond at the edge of the icy wastes. The children agreed to stay behind in Hrimhari's cell to emphasize the seriousness of the situation, for when the others do come back. Hrimhari and his friends travelled to Tiwaz's home, battling several of Hela's bat-creatures along the way. They survive a crash and capture by the Frost Giants thanks to Tiwaz. He told of much needed information about Hela's campaign. Though the three did not know it, this Tiwaz is Thor's great-grandfather. Tiwaz sent the trio on a mission; they free the Warriors Three from the dangerous Hive Trolls. Hrimhari recruited Ula, the queen of the trolls, to their side. The hive did not trust mortals nor most Asgardians; it was Hrimhari's honor that convinced them Hela was the true enemy.

Hrimhari joined Balder, the trolls and the other forces gathered to battle Hela's army. He is injured in battle and was not present when the New Mutants saved Odin from Hela's 'Deathsword', which was to be plunged into his sleeping form. The Warriors Three bring Hrimhari and many wounded warriors to the royal palace, which is acting as a makeshift hospital. All are healed by restorative magics. He learns that Rahne and her friends must leave again; they accomplish this despite Asgard being trapped in the Negative Zone.

Back with Wolfsbane
Later, Asgard suffered through the end of times, the Ragnarok, with the destruction of all its inhabitants. Yet all return in one form or another. Hrimhari himself surprised Wolfsbane, meeting her in an Earth forest. He tells of how Frost Giants had recently slain his pack to wear their skins. He had been fighting them when Ragnarok hit, claiming him the lives of all immortal beings. Hrimhari subsequently revealed a new ability, being able to shapeshift into a human form. He claimed that Midgard, Earth, is now a part of him. Hrimhari resumed his relationship with Rahne and consummated their relationship by making love before battling and killing Frost Giants. Rahne then fell unconscious soon afterwards and it had been revealed by Doctor Nemesis that she is pregnant with the Wolf Prince's child, which is neither human nor mutant and that the unborn child is threatening her health and her life. The Wolf Prince later made a deal with Hela. Faced with a moral dilemma of whom to save, his child or Rahne, he chose the mutant healer Elixir instead as he can heal both. She agreed and they returned to the Asgardian Underworld together. Hrimhari's final words to Rahne were that "he would somehow find his way back to Rahne and their unborn child." Revived, Elixir was able to heal Rahne. In doing so he realized that Rahne would not the survive the birth of the hybrid baby. Because of this Elixir transferred some of the baby's strength to Rahne. On Genosha, Rahne demonstrated that her strength, durability, and senses have been further enhanced.

A few months afterwards Wolfsbane had returned to X-Factor and let everybody believe that one-time lover Rictor was the father of her child. It is revealed that Hrimhari is now part of Hela's undead army. While X-Factor battled its way through the army in Niflhel, Hrimhari caught Rahne's scent on Rictor's boyfriend Shatterstar, as he and Wolfsbane had fought only a short time ago. Hrimhari attacked him because he believed that Shatterstar had forced himself on her. During this fight he revealed that he was the father of Rahne's child. The fight between the two men was stopped by Banshee who knocked Hrimhari out of the way with her sonic scream.

Other versions

What If?
Hrimhari appears in What If vol. 2 #12, in a story titled "What If the X-Men Stayed in Asgard". Rahne and Hrimhari had married and lived in the woods. He was killed in a later battle but left Rahne with three children (depicted as a wolf cub, a human baby and wolf-human-hybrid baby).

In other media
Hrimari is mentioned in the children's novel Odd and the Frost Giant where the titular character must save Asgard from the aforementioned giants.

References

External links
 Marvel Database: New Mutants Special Edition #1
 
 Hrimhari Fan Site

Characters created by Art Adams
Characters created by Chris Claremont
Comics characters introduced in 1985
Fictional characters with superhuman senses
Fictional werewolves
Marvel Comics Asgardians
Marvel Comics characters who are shapeshifters
Marvel Comics characters with superhuman strength
Marvel Comics male superheroes